USS Diploma (AM-221) was an  built for the United States Navy during World War II. She was awarded three battle stars for service in the Pacific during World War II. She was decommissioned in September 1946 and placed in reserve. While she remained in reserve, Diploma was reclassified as MSF-221 in February 1955 but never reactivated. In 1962, she was sold to the Mexican Navy and renamed ARM DM-17. In 1994 she was renamed ARM Cadete Francisco Márquez (C59). She was stricken in 2000, but her ultimate fate is not reported in secondary sources.

U.S. Navy career 
Diploma was launched 21 May 1944 by Tampa Shipbuilding Co., Inc., Tampa, Florida; sponsored by Mrs. F. J. Erwin, Jr.; and commissioned 15 July 1944.

Diploma arrived at Pearl Harbor 12 January 1945 with the disabled U.S. Army freighter FS-318 in tow. The next day she sailed on convoy escort duty to Guam and Eniwetok, returning to Pearl Harbor 17 February. Diploma was underway from Pearl Harbor 23 February for Ulithi where she conducted minesweeping exercises in preparation for the invasion of Okinawa. On 19 March she got underway for Okinawa to engage in pre-invasion minesweeping from 24 March until 1 April and then patrolled during the initial landings. From 17 April to 15 May she was in Ulithi for repairs. After escorting convoys to Guam and Saipan, Diploma returned to Okinawa the last day of May to resume patrolling. From 4 July to 31 July she swept mines in support of the final U.S. 3rd Fleet raids on the Japanese mainland.

After the cessation of hostilities she continued sweeping in the East China Sea-Ryukyus area and in the Tsugaru Straits into Ominato Naval Base at the northern tip of Honshū. Diploma received three battle stars for World War II service.

On 20 November Diploma sailed for the west coast, arriving at San Diego, California, 20 December. She was underway on 5 January 1946 for Mobile, Alabama, and after visits there and at New Orleans, Louisiana, arrived at Orange, Texas, 12 May. Diploma was placed out of commission in reserve there 3 September 1946. She was reclassified MSF-221, 7 February 1955. Transferred to Mexico as DM-17, later renamed Cadete Francisco Marquez (C-59)

Mexican Navy career 
The former Diploma was acquired by the Mexican Navy in 1962 and renamed ARM DM-17. In 1994, she was renamed ARM Cadete Francisco Márquez (C59) after Francisco Márquez. She was stricken in 2000, but her ultimate fate is not reported in secondary sources.

Notes

References

External links
 

Admirable-class minesweepers
Ships built in Tampa, Florida
1944 ships
World War II minesweepers of the United States
Admirable-class minesweepers of the Mexican Navy